G.R.L. is the debut extended play (EP) by American girl group G.R.L., released on July 29, 2014 by Kemosabe Records and RCA Records.

Background
In an interview with PopCrush, the group stated that they are working with Dr. Luke, Max Martin, Cirkut, Darkchild, and Lukas Hilbert for a new album, which is set to release in 2014.

Promotion
Prior to the release of their EP, the group began a monthlong promotional tour on September 10, 2013, in Brooklyn, New York, partnered with Claire's and Westfield Malls meeting fans, visiting radio stations, and performing at select locations.

On March 14, 2014, the group performed at the iTunes Festival at SXSW, opening for Zedd and Pitbull. They performed the songs "Girls Are Always Right", "Show Me What You Got", "Vacation", "Rewind", and "Ugly Heart".

Singles
"Ugly Heart" was released as the lead single on June 3, 2014. It was sent to mainstream radio on June 24, 2014. The music video was directed by Chris Marrs Piliero. It premiered on July 1, 2014.

Promotional singles
"Show Me What You Got" was released as the first promotional single on February 18, 2014. It is also part of the compilation album Now That's What I Call Music! 49.

Track listing

References

2014 debut EPs
RCA Records EPs